Mary Lawlor is Adjunct Professor of Business and Human Rights in the School of Business of Trinity College Dublin. An Irish national, she is currently the United Nations Special Rapporteur on the situation of human rights defenders, appointed for a three-year term from May 2020. She is the founder and former Executive Director of Front Line Defenders and former Director of the Irish branch of Amnesty International.

Background
Lawlor was born in 1952 in Ireland, the second-eldest of seven sisters, and grew up in Kilmacud, a suburb of Dublin. She holds a first degree in philosophy and psychology, from University College Dublin, and postgraduate degrees in Montessori teaching and personnel management.

She was married in 1969.

Career 
The focus of Lawlor's career has been the protection of human rights defenders, after a few early years selling encyclopaedias in Canada, and teaching at kindergarten.

She joined the Irish branch of Amnesty International as a fundraiser, after meeting and being inspired by Seán MacBride. In 1975 she became a member of its Board and for four years from 1983 was national chair. From 1988 to 2000, she led the organisation as its Director.

The following year, she founded Front Line Defenders, which actively protects those who work non-violently to uphold the human rights of others, as outlined in the Universal Declaration of Human Rights. She was the organisation's Executive Director from 2001–2016.

She helped draw up the EU Guidelines on the Protection of Human Rights Defenders, adopted by the Council of the European Union in June 2004.

In March 2020, Lawlor was appointed United Nations Special Rapporteur on the situation of human rights defenders, for a three-year term from 1 May 2020, succeeding Michel Forst.

Other roles and awards
Lawlor currently serves on the boards of the Irish Council for Civil Liberties, the University College Dublin Centre for Ethics in Public Life, and the Norwegian Human Rights Fund.

In 2014, she was awarded the Insignia of Knight of the Legion of Honour, for her human rights work.

In 2016 she was awarded the Franco-German Award for Human Rights and the Rule of Law.

References

External links 
United Nations Special rapporteur on the situation of human rights defenders
Amnesty International
Front Line Defenders

United Nations special rapporteurs
Living people
Irish officials of the United Nations
Alumni of Trinity College Dublin
Amnesty International people
1952 births
Irish human rights activists